is a 2013 Japanese smartphone game developed by Acquire for iOS and Android devices. An anime television series adaptation by Pierrot aired from January 8, 2016 to March 25, 2016.

Plot
The living, heavens, and underworld become connected after a Divine Gate is opened, ushering in an era of chaos where desires and conflict intersect. Only when the World Council is formed are peace and order restored and the Divine Gate becomes an urban legend. In that world, boys and girls deemed fit by the World Council are gathered, who aim to reach the gate for their personal objectives. Those who reach the gate can remake the world and even the past or future.

Characters

A fire user. After the train incident, he is one of the adapters who tries to persuade Aoto into joining the academy. He was proud of and cared a lot about his father who is said to have died in an accident during one of his experiments and as a result, hates it when Aoto proclaims that he killed his parents. He does not believe his father died in an accident as he was not the type to make mistakes in his experiments.

A water user. Thought to be his parents' killer, he secludes himself and makes no friends. After saving a girl from a fire user in a train, Arthur and the other adapters try to recruit him into the academy numerous times since he doesn't fit in at his current school and because of his abilities but he refuses. He later joins the academy.

An air user and Akane's best friend. After the train incident, she is one of the adapters who try to persuade Aoto into joining the academy. Midori and Elena were friends in their childhood.

Chairman of the academy. Has an extreme interest in Aoto and his friends. Tries multiple times to recruit Aoto.

The Key Spirit of the Divine Gate. Boy K has been following Aoto since childhood and appears frequently in front of him. Aoto is the only one who is able to see him, because he is the only character who is able to open the Divine Gate but refuses to do so.

A fire spirit who is a teacher at the Academy.

A water spirit who is a teacher at the Academy. In charge of recruiting Aoto into the academy by Arthur's order.

A wind spirit who is a teacher at the Academy.

A wizard Arthur invited to watch him reach the gate and change the world.

A mischievous god with hidden agendas.

A knight of the Round who believes that Aoto killed his father.

Akane's father.

Aoto's younger brother who went missing.

/

Midori's childhood friend who went missing.

Arthur's childhood friend.

Media

Anime
An anime television series adaptation by Pierrot aired from January 8 to March 25, 2016. The opening theme is "One Me Two Hearts" by Hitorie, and the ending theme is "Contrast" by vistlip. The series is licensed in North America and the British Isles by Funimation. Anime Limited is releasing the series for Funimation in the United Kingdom and Ireland.

Episodes

Notes

References

External links
 
 

2013 video games
Android (operating system) games
Funimation
IOS games
Japan-exclusive video games
Pierrot (company)
Video games developed in Japan
Acquire (company) games